140 New Montgomery Street, originally known as The Pacific Telephone & Telegraph Company Building, and, after 1984, as The Pacific Bell Building or The PacBell Building, in San Francisco's South of Market district, is an Art Deco mixed-use office tower located close to the St. Regis Museum Tower and the San Francisco Museum of Modern Art.

The 26-floor building was designed to consolidate numerous smaller buildings and outdated offices into a modern headquarters for The Pacific Telephone & Telegraph Co., and as a result, was designated as the Pacific Telephone & Telegraph Co. Coast Division Offices by the company, though referred to colloquially as The Telephone Building. When it opened on May 30, 1925, The Pacific Telephone Building was San Francisco's first significant skyscraper development, and was the tallest building in San Francisco, until the Russ Building matched its height in 1927 at the time of its completion. The building was the first high-rise south of Market Street, and along with the Russ Building, remained the city's tallest until it was overtaken by 650 California Street in 1964.  It was the first high rise located on the west coast to be occupied solely by a single tenant.

AT&T sold the building in 2007, and as of 2013, Internet company Yelp is the main tenant.

Construction and original tenant

At the time of its construction, it housed The Pacific Telephone & Telegraph Co., a member of the Bell System. The building once had a bell motif in many places on its façade, most notably surrounding the arch over the main entrance doors on New Montgomery Street. After the breakup of the Bell System (AT&T) in 1984, and the formation the Regional Bell Operating Companies, also known as the Baby Bells, Pacific Telephone changed its name to Pacific Bell.

Statues of eight eagles (each  in height) perch atop the tower's crown. The building has an L—shaped floor plan, and the architecture decoratively incorporates spotlights to show the exterior's terra cotta ornamentation day and night.

In 1929, Sir Winston Churchill visited the building and made his first transatlantic telephone call, phoning his London home.

In the 21st century
In 2008, the new owners filed plans to convert the tower into 118 luxury condominiums. However, those plans were put on hold during the 2008 financial crisis, and the building sat empty for nearly six years.

Following a surge in office demand in 2010–2011, Wilson Meany Sullivan changed the plans back to office space. In 2012, Yelp announced it had signed a lease on the building's  of office space through 2020. After two expansions, the company held a total of almost  on 13 floors in the fall 2015.

In April 2016, Pembroke Real Estate Inc., a Boston–based REIT, acquired 140 New Montgomery as part of its portfolio — its second acquisition in San Francisco.

See also

South of Market, San Francisco (SOMA)
Eliel Saarinen's Tribune Tower design
Russ Building
List of tallest buildings in San Francisco

External links

 
 
 140 New Montgomery Street at the Council on Tall Buildings and Urban Habitat's The Skyscraper Center
 
 
 Pacific Telephone & Telegraph Co. Building by James R. Miller, 1924, architectural drawing, charcoal and graphite on paper, at the San Francisco Museum of Modern Art
 
Pacific Telephone & Telegraph Company Building photographs for multiple San Francisco locations at the San Francisco Public Library

References

Buildings and structures completed in 1925
Art Deco architecture in California
Historic American Buildings Survey in California
Skyscraper office buildings in San Francisco
South of Market, San Francisco